Humaymah Kabirah is a Syrian town located in Dayr Hafir District, Aleppo.  According to the Syria Central Bureau of Statistics (CBS), Humaymah Kabirah had a population of 4,190 in the 2004 census.

References

Populated places in Dayr Hafir District